Juergen Antonio Elitim Sepúlveda (born 13 July 1999) is a Colombian footballer who plays as a central midfielder for Spanish club Racing de Santander, on loan from English club Watford.

Club career
Born in Cartagena, Elitim moved to Cali at the age of 12, joining Club JC FC Cyclones' youth setup. After impressing in a tournament at the age of 15, he agreed to a deal with Granada CF, but was unable to join the club until the age of 18; he was assigned to Leones FC instead.

Elitim made his first team debut for Leones on 9 October 2016, aged 17, by playing the last eight minutes of a 2–1 Categoría Primera B home win against Tigres. In July 2017, he moved to Granada after his 18th birthday.

On 22 August 2018, Elitim joined Segunda División B side Marbella FC for the 2018–19 season. On 31 July of the following year, after having his federative rights assigned to Watford, his loan was renewed for a further year.

On 9 August 2020, Elitim agreed to a one-year loan deal with Segunda División side Ponferradina. He made his professional debut on 20 September, coming on as a late substitute for Yuri de Souza in a 2–0 away win against Albacete Balompié.

On 9 July 2021, Elitim returned to Spain, joining Deportivo de La Coruña on a season-long loan deal. On 2 July of the following year, he moved to Racing de Santander on a one-year loan deal.

References

External links

1999 births
Living people
Sportspeople from Cartagena, Colombia
Colombian footballers
Association football midfielders
Categoría Primera B players
Leones F.C. footballers
Segunda División players
Primera Federación players
Segunda División B players
Marbella FC players
SD Ponferradina players
Deportivo de La Coruña players
Racing de Santander players
Watford F.C. players
Colombian expatriate footballers
Colombian expatriate sportspeople in Spain
Expatriate footballers in Spain